Dipya Mongkollugsana (12 October 1918 – 14 January 1984) was a Thai oral surgeon, naval commander (as of 1969) and former sports shooter. He attended a Fulbright fellowship at the Ohio State University in 1952. He is a founding member of the Skeet & Trap Shooting Association of Thailand, and competed in the trap event at the 1968 Summer Olympics.

References

External links
 

1918 births
1984 deaths
Dipya Mongkollugsana
Dipya Mongkollugsana
Dipya Mongkollugsana
Dipya Mongkollugsana
Shooters at the 1968 Summer Olympics
Asian Games medalists in shooting
Shooters at the 1974 Asian Games
Dipya Mongkollugsana
Medalists at the 1974 Asian Games
20th-century dentists
Dipya Mongkollugsana